Hopewell is an unincorporated community in Fauquier County, Virginia, United States. It lies at an elevation of 679 feet (207 m).

References

Unincorporated communities in Fauquier County, Virginia
Unincorporated communities in Virginia